The Woman's Club of Chipley is a historic woman's club in Chipley, Florida, located at 607 Fifth Street. It is on the same block as the historic Chipley City Hall. It was built in 1931 in the Craftsman style by Thomas Langston. On December 8, 1997, it was added to the U.S. National Register of Historic Places.

See also
List of Registered Historic Woman's Clubhouses in Florida

References

External links
 Washington County listings at National Register of Historic Places
 Woman's Club of Chipley at Florida's Office of Cultural and Historical Programs

Clubhouses on the National Register of Historic Places in Florida
Buildings and structures in Washington County, Florida
Women's clubs in Florida
Women's club buildings in Florida
National Register of Historic Places in Washington County, Florida